The East Hill Residential Historic District is a large old neighborhood on the east side of Wausau, Wisconsin where many prominent citizens lived, with about 165 contributing properties built from 1883 to 1945. It was added to the National Register of Historic Places in 2004.

Description
In addition to residential buildings, the district also features Wausau East High School, built in 1936 and expanded later. Houses in the district include ones designed by Alexander C. Eschweiler and George W. Maher. Among them is the E.K. Schuetz House.

References

Further reading
 Hettinga and Aucutt's NRHP nomination among the references above lists all the buildings and describes the first owners.

Historic districts on the National Register of Historic Places in Wisconsin
Geography of Marathon County, Wisconsin
National Register of Historic Places in Marathon County, Wisconsin